"Bella Vita" is a 1986 pop-ballad song recorded by French vocal duet David et Jonathan. Written by Olivier Lanquetin and duet member David Marouani with a music composed by Marouani, it was their debut single from their 1988 album, Cœur de gosse, on which it appears as the fifth track, and was released in the first months of 1987. It achieved success in France, peaking at number two.

Lyrics and music video
"Bella Vita" was written by Lanquetin and Marouani, the latter being only 15 years old at the time. The verses are alternately sung in Italian and English, while the refrain is only in Italian. The music video accompagning the song was shot in Saint-Paul-de-Vence, France.

Critical reception
A review in Pan-European magazine Music & Media presented "Bella Vita" as "the duo's slow, saccharine pop ballad" and noted his huge success in France.

Chart performance
In France, "Bella Vita" debuted at number 41 on the chart edition of 30 May 1987, entered the top ten in its fourth week where it remained for 15 weeks; it reached number two for non consecutive two weeks, being unable to dislodge first Madonna's "La Isla Bonita", then Vanessa Paradis's "Joe le taxi" which topped the chart then; it fell off the top 50 after 24 weeks of presence. It earned a Gold disc, awarded by the Syndicat National de l'Édition Phonographique. On the European Hot 100 Singles, it debuted at number 59 on 13 June 1987, reached a peak of number 20 for consecutive two weeks, and desappeared from the chart after 22 weeks of presence.

Track listings
 7" single - France, Benelux, Italy
 "Bella Vita" — 4:10
 "In My Heart" — 3:47

 12" maxi - France
 "Bella Vita" — 4:30
 "In My Heart" — 3:47

 7" single - Canada
 "Bella Vita" — 4:25
 "Prénoms bibliques" — 3:24

Personnel
 Arrangement — Bernard Estardy
 Production — Pascal Auriat, Zone Music
 Photography — François Gaillard

Charts

Weekly charts

Year-end charts

Certifications

Release history

References

1987 songs
1987 debut singles
David et Jonathan songs
Male vocal duets
Macaronic songs